Bakurochō (馬喰町) may refer to:
 Nihonbashi Bakurochō
 Bakurochō Station